Yaakov Choueka, better known by his stage name Yaakov Shwekey, is an Orthodox Jewish recording artist and musical entertainer. He is of Egyptian and Syrian Sephardic heritage from his father's side;  and Ashkenazi from his mother‘s side.

Family and early life
Yaakov Shwekey was born in Jerusalem to an Ashkenazi Jewish mother raised in the United States, and a Sephardi Jewish father born in Cairo to a family from a Syrian background. His parents had met and married in New York City. In his early years, Shwekey lived in the Bayit VeGan neighborhood of Jerusalem, but he eventually moved to Polanco, Mexico City, and attended Yeshiva Ateret Yosef. He later lived in Lakewood, NJ, and Brooklyn, NY, and attended Yeshiva of Brooklyn before moving to Long Branch, NJ. As a child, he sang in the Ateret Yosef Choir in Mexico City, and he and his brother Yisroel Meir sang with the Miami Boys Choir for a short period of time. In his young adult years, Shwekey learned in Rabbi Menachem Davidowitz's yeshiva (TIUNY) in Rochester, NY. After learning for a few years in the Deal kollel and his consequent marriage, Shwekey launched his professional career as a singer.

Musical style
Shwekey's songs and lyrics are generally composed by others. Until late 2015, his albums were produced by Yochi Briskman, and distributed in the US by Aderet Music, and in Israel by JMI. Going forward, he has produced his own albums with Yitzy Waldner. Many different arrangers have arranged his albums in the past including Moshe Laufer, Mona Rosenblum, Yanky Briskman, Avrumi Berko, Leib Yaakov Rigler, and Yisroel Lamm. Until 2006 Shwekey's primary studio was "Studio X" (run by Yochi Briskman, engineered by AJ Greenwald); today, some of his recording is done in his private home studio.

One of his best-known songs is Racheim (Have Compassion), composed by Pinky Weber. The lyrics are from the grace after meals, asking God to have mercy on the Jewish nation and the city of Jerusalem. As Shwekey describes this song, "It's a prayer. It's not just a song. We connect with God and ask Him to have mercy."  In 2008/2009 Vehi She'omdah, composed by Yonatan Razel and debuted on his Live in Caesaria concert DVD, and later rerecorded on Ad Bli Dai, became a major hit. Many of his songs, including Shomati (from the Talmud) composed by Yossi Green, and Im Eshkacheich, from Psalm 137, composed by Yochanan Shapiro, have found considerable popularity as Jewish wedding songs. His latest hits are: Cry No More, Ra'u Banim, Bo'ee Be'shalom, Lo Ya'avod, Am Yisrael, and Et Rekod, among others. From his album We are a Miracle, the songs Maamin Bensim, Smachot, Maran Sheli, and Inshallah were met with critical acclaim and can be heard across the world at Jewish events and celebrations and in Jewish homes, schools, and camps everywhere. He sang a new tune, composed by Yitzy Waldner, to Mi Shebeirach a prayer globally recited for soldiers in the IDF, in the Nokia Stadium, Tel Aviv in 2013, in the presence of many Israeli soldiers. In June 2018, Shwekey released Musica, on which he displayed a variety of styles, with lyrics in multiple languages.

Recent projects
Shwekey released his tenth solo studio album in June 2018. Entitled Musica, it was Shwekey's second self-produced solo album  (the first being We Are a Miracle), though in the credits, Shwekey credited Yitzy Waldner with being his co-producer. Waldner also composed most of the album's songs, with most of the lyrics for the album written by longtime lyricist Miriam Israeli. Additionally, Waldner made a guest appearance on the album's second song, Tefilat Hashla, as can be seen on music steaming service Spotify's catalogue of the album's songs.

Another album release was in 2019, “Those Were The Days 2”, a medley album featuring past hits and classics from various sources and arranged by different composers.

On 19 April 2020 during the COVID-19 pandemic, Shwekey collaborated with popular Chabad-Lubavitch rabbi and speaker Rabbi Y.Y. Jacobson, both working from home, to stream a free online live concert on YouTube. The reason for this, Shwekey said, was to "make people happy, because that's what God gave me the ability to do". The concert was viewed 138 thousand times within its first three weeks online, and is still available on YouTube, accessible via the original link.

Concert controversy
In August 2007, Shwekey and Avraham Fried were slated to headline a major concert in Jerusalem at Teddy Stadium.  The event was produced by Moshe Ben-Zimra and billed as a commemoration of the 40th anniversary of the reunification of Jerusalem.
Leading Haredi rabbis, including Rabbi Yosef Shalom Elyashiv, the Gerrer Rebbe, the Belzer Rebbe, Rabbi Aharon Leib Shteinman, Rabbi Shmuel Wosner, and Rabbi Chaim Pinchas Scheinberg signed a ban which appeared in the Haredi press forbidding participation or attendance of the event or similar events. Their ban stated that concerts should not be performed in front of both men and women, regardless if there was separate seating.

Shwekey issued a response that he had already posed the question to Rabbi Ovadia Yosef when an earlier concert featuring him, along with Mordechai Ben David, was also banned. Rabbi Yosef responded that there is absolutely no prohibition as long as the event had completely separate seating. Neither Shwekey nor Fried pulled out of the concert.

Notable duet concerts

In July 2019, Shwekey and Omer Adam sang a duet together.  Yaakov Shwekey headlined a concert together with Shlomi Shabbat at Live Park in Rishon Letzion, Israel and Nokia Arena in Tel Aviv. On February 25, 2020, Yaakov Shwekey and Kobi Peretz headlined a concert together at the Pais Arena in Jerusalem. Yaakov Shwekey and Ishay Ribo performed together at a recent concert in Israel. Yaakov Shwekey and Hanan Ben Ari performed live in Tel Aviv together in 2016.

Shwekey has been praised for his ability to collaborate with Jewish musicians of various backgrounds and for having the rare ability to reach Jews from all corners of the Jewish world. He is widely considered one of the most popular Jewish religious singers in the world today.

Personal life and philanthropy 
He and his wife Jenine and their six children live in Long Branch, NJ. Jenine is the co-founder of the Special Children's Center in Lakewood, New Jersey, a respite and support program for special needs children, and Shwekey also volunteers much time and energy to this philanthropic endeavor. All proceeds of his single I Can Be were donated to the center. In an interview with Yated Ne'eman, Shwekey said, "I'm convinced that the success I've experienced in my music career is all because of our work with these special children."

Shwekey had a close relationship with Rabbi Ovadia Yosef, and his single Maran Sheli is dedicated to his memory.

Endorsement of Donald Trump 
In August 2020, Shwekey held a concert at the Orthodox summer camp Camp Teumim Mesivta in Pennsylvania and performed "We Are America", a version of his 2016 single "We Are A Miracle" with new lyrics endorsing President Donald Trump's reelection campaign. The new lyrics had been written by Mishpacha editor Yisroel Besser for a Trump fundraiser earlier that summer at the home of late Trump donor Stanley Chera, and Shwekey would later film a music video for this version of the song. Video of the Teumim Mesivta performance, which showed Shwekey performing the song to an apparently unmasked audience and ended with chants of "U.S.A! U.S.A!", went viral online and was received critically by some non-Orthodox sources.

Discography

In addition, Shwekey appears on the following albums:

 Yonasan Weiss with The Yeshiva Boys Choir, 1988 (Child Solo on "Maher")
 Torah Today (Miami Boys Choir), 1990 (Member of the Boys Choir)
 Shuvu El Hashem (R' Shmuel Brazil), 2000 ("Kechu", "Kerasicha", "Im Eshkachech", "Shuvi Nafshi", and "Yerushalayim")
 Dance With Neginah 5 (Neginah Orchestra), 2001 ("Zoche" and "Hora Medley")
 Dance With the Stars, 2002 ("Zoche")
 The Best of The Best 2 (Gideon Levine), 2002 ("Al Tiktzof")
 Miami 25 (Miami Boys Choir), 2002 ("Racheim" duet with Child Soloist Mordechai Shapiro)
 Journeys 4  (Abie Rotenberg), 2002 ("Mama Rachel")
 A Time for Music XVIII (HASC), 2005 ("Ben Bag Bag", "Mama Rachel", "Ki Hatov", "Rebono", and "Finale")
 Vezakeni (Baruch Levine), 2006 ("Vehu Keili")
 Eternity (Oorah), 2006 ("Eternity")
 A Time for Music XIX (HASC), 2006 ("Yedid" and "Finale")
 Harei Yehuda (Yehuda Gilden), 2008 ("Yehi Shalom")
 A Time for Music XXII (HASC), 2009 ("Emes", "Tatte", "Leshem Shomayim", "Vehu Keili", "Mi K'amcha Yisrael", "Carlebach Medley", "Rachem Medley", "Ma Ma Ma", and "Finale")
 Mona 7 (Mona Rosenblum), 2017 ("Uteshuva U'Tefilah Utzedakah")
 Shir 3 (Shlomo Yehuda Rechnitz), 2021 ("Achas")

References

External links
 
 Interview with Yaakov Shwekey on Jewish Community Radio

1977 births
Living people
American Orthodox Jews
American people of Egyptian-Jewish descent
American people of Syrian-Jewish descent
American Sephardic Jews
American Ashkenazi Jews
Hasidic entertainers
Jewish American musicians
Jewish singers
Musicians from Brooklyn
People from Deal, New Jersey
Yiddish-language singers of the United States
Orthodox pop musicians
Musicians from Jerusalem